This is a list of radio stations broadcasting regularly programmes in Italian outside Italy:

Local broadcast
List of radios company in Italian language:

Programs in italian language
Radios with programs in Italian language in the schedule:

International broadcast

Medium wave

Shortwave 

Hours valid for Daylight Saving Time from October 30, 2022 to March 25, 2023

Closed

See also 
 List of Italian language television channels

References

Italian
 
Italian-language radio stations